Dacryodes excelsa is a tree native to Puerto Rico with a habitat that extends into the Lesser Antilles in the Caribbean region. Its English vernacular names include gommier and candlewood. Its Spanish common name is tabonuco. According to Richards, "it is the most conspicuous large emergent tree" in the Luquillo mountains of Puerto Rico. It is also found in Toro Negro State Forest, in Puerto Rico Cordillera Central.

References

excelsa
Trees of the Caribbean
Flora of Puerto Rico
Flora without expected TNC conservation status